Tread may refer to:

Arts and media
Tread (film), a 2019 American documentary film about Marvin Heemeyer
Tread (Transformers)
 Tread, a character in the novel series Transformers: The Veiled Threat
Tread rap, subgenre of trap that began in Philadelphia in the mid-2010s
Tread, a 2021 album by British record producer Ross from Friends

Other uses
Shoe tread, pattern on the bottom of a shoe
Stair tread, horizontal portion of a set of stairs on which a person walks
Tire tread, patterned outer surface of a tyre that makes contact with the road
Tread (river terrace), the level section of a river terrace